Umbelopsis is a genus of fungi, belonging to the family Umbelopsidaceae.

The genus was described in 1966 by Raymond E. Amos and Horace L. Barnett.

Species:
 Umbelopsis isabellina
 Umbelopsis ramanniana
 Umbelopsis vinacea

References

Zygomycota